Musiri is a municipality in the Tiruchirappalli district in the Indian state of Tamil Nadu. It has an average elevation of 82 metres (269 feet).

Etymology 
The original name of this town was "Musukundapuri", named after a Chola king Musukundan.

Demographics

Population 
 India census, Musiri had a population of 27,941. Males constitute 50% of the population and females 50%. Musiri has an average literacy rate of 75%, male literacy is 80%, and female literacy is 69%.  In Musiri, 11% of the population is under 6 years of age.

Government and politics  
Musiri (state assembly constituency) is a separate assembly constituency falling under Perambalur (Lok Sabha constituency). It is a Taluk and Revenue Division headquarters in Tiruchirappalli District of Tamil Nadu state in India.

Economy 
Agriculture is the main occupation in this town situated on the northern bank of Kaveri river having  a broad width of more than 1km. The crops include paddy, sugar cane, banana and vegetables. Korai grass(Reed) mat/Chatai mat weaving is done here.

Transport

By Road  

The town is connected to Kulithalai town by a  bridge across river Kaveri.

Adjacent communities

References 

Cities and towns in Tiruchirappalli district